Flamurtari FC is a professional football club based in Vlorë, Albania. The club plays in the Kategoria e Parë, which is the second tier of football in the country.

Founded in 1923, the club is one of the oldest in Albania, and it is also one of the most successful clubs, having won one Albanian Superliga title in 1991 four Albanian Cups and two Albanian Supercups. Flamurtari is also known for their European runs in the 1980s, where they famously reached the last sixteen in the 1987–88 UEFA Cup, where they beat Spanish giants Barcelona in Vlorë but lost on aggregate.

History

Foundation
KS Flamurtari Vlorë were founded on 23 March 1923 as Shoqeria Sportive Vlorë with Milto Korçari as the club's first ever President, while Malo Ismaili held the role of the secretary and Faslli Zoga that of the financier. The club was created to make sports and especially football more organized and more popular. Its financial needs were covered by donations from the members or from different activities organized in the city of Vlorë. Shoqeria Sportive played their first football match against Shoqëria Sportive Jeronim de Rada, a local team created from students from Vlorë. The match ended in a 2–2 draw. The goals for Shoqeria Sportive were scored by Adem Gavani and Hazbi Tepelena. During the 1920s the club played several friendlies with other Albanian and foreign teams. Interesting were the matches against Crnogorac Cetinje and the football team of the Livorno Naval Institute which the Red and Black Fleet both won 1–0 and 3–2 respectively. Shoqeria Sportive Vlorë were a founder member of the Albanian Football Association and participated in the first championship. Its first official match was against Skënderbeu Korçë in Vlorë and ended with a 2–0 win. The team's first captain in an official match was Jani Kosta. In the first championship Shoqeria Sportive finished bottom of the table with two wins (vs. Skënderbeu Korçë at home, 2–0, and vs. Urani Elbasan away, 2–1), two draws (vs. Skënderbeu Korçë away, 0–0, and vs. Bashkimi Shkodran at home, 1–1) and six losses.

World War II
In the 1931 championship Shoqeria Sportive played in Group A against Tirana and Bashkimi Shkodran collecting a win at home against Bashkimi Shkodran and three losses, with a negative goal difference of 4–9. Finishing last of the table meant that the team was relegated to the Kategoria e Dyte. Shoqeria Sportive was drawn to play for the next season in Group C of the Kategoria e Dyte against Leka i Madh Permet, Narta and Shqiponja Gjirokastër. The championship ended with success as the team was crowned champions of Group C and thus qualified for the play-off final against the Group B champion, Sportklub Kavajë. The one-legged tie ended 3–1 in favour of Sportklub Kavajë, which meant that Shoqeria Sportive remained for another year in the Second Division. In the next championship Nimet Abazi Delvinë and Vetëtima Himarë entered the competition, while Sportklub Narta withdrew. The season proved once again the superiority of the Red and Black team against their Second Division opponents, by finishing once again top of the Group C and securing promotion. In the two-legged final against Sportklub Elbasan, which determined the winner of the Second Division, Shoqeria Sportive lost 4–3 on aggregate, thus ending the season as runners-up.

The 1934 started with big problems for the team and ended in the worst ways possible, with the Kuqezinjte drawing one and losing the rest of their matches, closing with a −32 goal difference. A total revolution was needed and it came in 1935, when President of the club was chosen Kristaq Strati. He quickly organised the staff and made affiliations with the local amateur teams in Vlore, thus securing young talented players. The team changed the way of playing focusing more on technique and speed and creating its own style of play thanks to the job done by an early activist of the team, Besim Qorri. To complete the revolution on the team, the Board decided to change the team's name from Shoqëria Sportive Vlorë to Shoqata Sportive Ismail Qemali. The next season proved to be more positive and Sh.S. Ismail Qemali finished seventh out of eight teams, but this time with three wins, three draws and eight losses with e goal difference of −21 (GF 14 – GA 35). Even though the team had some great results during the season, the most memorable being the 0–2 away win against Bashkimi Elbasanas, it still didn't avoid a record 11–0 defeat against rivals Tirana. The 1937 championship was almost the same with the previous season with the team finishing 9th out of ten teams, leaving behind only Tomori Berat thanks to a better goal difference.

On 7 April 1939, Albania was invaded by Italy and became an Italian protectorate. However, the invaders were careful to keep football going and thus the 1939 championship started on 1 July 1939. Eight teams were separated in groups of four and played in a knock-out system with two-legged matches to qualify to the semi-finals. Sh.S. Ismail Qemali was drawn to play against Teuta. The first match was played in Kavajë on July 2 and ended in a 1–1 draw. The second was played in the Shallvare Ground in Tiranë on 6 August 1939 and ended 3–2 in favour of Teuta. This match was one of the earliest football matches to be transmitted on Radio Tirana, by Albanian journalist Anton Mazreku. After the end of the game, Sh.S. Ismail Qemali appealed against the result, pretending that the last minutes of the game were played on total darkness and the result was affected by the lack of lighting. The Technical Commission decided that the game would be replayed. On 10 September 1939, once again at the Shallvare Ground the two teams tried to eliminate each other but Teuta was superior and won the match by three to one. This meant Sh.S. Ismail Qemali was knocked out of the tournament.

1945–1980
In November 1944, Shoqata Sportive Ismail Qemali was re-opened. The championship began on 16 September 1945 and the club was playing against Vllaznia. SH.S. Ismail Qemali lost 1–0. The 1945 season saw the team end in fourth place in a 6 team league. The next championship would be better for The Fleet. On 22 June 1946, the club renamed itself Klubi Sportiv Flamurtari Vlorë. The 1946 season saw Flamurtari going to the championship final after winning First Division Group B. The final was played in two legs, one in Vlorë and one in Shkodër. Flamurtari lost both matches with an aggregated score of 5–0. In 1948, Flamurtari played once again in the final, still losing to Partizani Tirana, 6–2 in Qemal Stafa. In 1951 the club changed its name to Puna Vlorë, but in 1958 the club used once again the name Flamurtari. In 1954 Flamurtari participated in the Spartak Cup and won the competition after beating Vllaznia 6–0 and KS Teuta and Ylli i Kuq Pogradec 2–0. After reaching twice the championship final, in 1960 made it to the Albanian Cup final. In the first round playing against Ylli i Kuq Pogradec and beating them both at home and away matches. In the second round Flamurtari would play against Besa Kavajë. The teams drew both matches and had to go on extra time. After 90 minutes played in Kavaje and 135 minutes played in Vlorë the two teams were still equal. Flamurtari passed the second round thanks to the corners rule: the team that had more corners would qualify. These were 8 to 5 for Flamurtari. In the third round Flamurtari played against Skënderbeu Korçë. The first match in Vlorë ended in a 3–0 win for the home side. In Korce, in the 2nd leg match, Skënderbeu Korçë were leading 3–0 in half-time. In the second half Flamurtari made one of the greatest comebacks in the history of Albanian football winning 4–3 in the end of the 90 minutes. In the final the team played against Dinamo Tirana and they lost 1–0 after a hard-fought match. The next years were almost same for the team, placed always in mid-table.

Golden years
In the 1980s Flamurtari regained their former status as one of the big names in Albanian football. Flamurtari finished in 8th place in the 1980–81 season, but in the following season rose to second, runners-up to SK Tirana. During the season Flamurtari remained unbeaten in all matches at home in all competitions. In 1981 Flamurtari would participate for the first time in an international cup, the Balkans Cup. They played AEK Athens but they lost 3–2 in the Olympic Stadium of Athens. They finished second in their group with two wins and two losses, achieving 7–8 goals in the process. In 1983–84 Flamurtari once again reached the Albanian Cup final but lost to Tirana. In the season after, Flamurtari won the Albanian Cup. They defeated KF Partizani and thus claimed their first ever professional trophy.

In 1985–86, Flamurtari finished second in the championship losing the trophy only by goal difference to Dinamo Tirana. Finishing second in the championship, Flamurtari would play in the UEFA Cup. They were drawn against FC Barcelona. Flamurtari was eliminated after two draws (1–1 in Vlorë, 0–0 in Barcelona) thanks to the away goal rule. Flamurtari showed their strength by drawing the first match in Barcelona and taking the lead in the 26th minute in Vlorë, but FC Barcelona scored a late away goal to deny the Fleet's triumph. In that season Flamurtari managed once again to finish in 2nd place and to reach the Albanian Cup final losing on aggregate, 4–3, to Vllaznia.

After a perfect season they gained the right to play for the second consecutive year in the UEFA Cup. In the first round they had to play against Partizan Belgrade. After a 2–0 win in Vlorë, a result of a great Rrapo Taho and an own goal, Flamurtari were playing at Narodna Armija Stadium on 30 September 1987. Partizan were leading 2–0 until the 76th minute when Sokol Kushta scored the goal that took Flamurtari in the next round.

In the second round Flamurtari were drawn against Wismut Aue. In the first game in Aue, Flamurtari lost 0–1 being denied many times by keeper Weisflog, however in the second leg there was nothing to do for Aue as Flamurtari defeated them, 2–0.

In the third round Flamurtari were drawn once again against FC Barcelona. First leg was played at Camp Nou in front of 35,000 spectators on 25 November. Flamurtari scored in the first half and the players went to the first half break with a score Barcelona-Flamurtari 0–1.
However, in the second half Barcelona turned the situation in favour and won with scoreline 4–1. Flamurtari narrowly won the second leg, 1–0, which wasn't enough to secure the next round and was therefore eliminated from UEFA Cup after six played matches.

In the same season Flamurtari went all the way to win the Albanian Cup, after beating KF Partizani, 1–0, and securing their second cup title. In 1989 Flamurtari played in the Cup Winners Cup against Lech Poznań. After two games Flamurtari was eliminated by losing both home and away matches, 4–2 on aggregate. In the Kategoria Superiore the team finished in the third place. Just a year after Flamurtari lifted for the first time in their history the Kategoria Superiore title. After some stunning results during the season (including beating runners-up Partizani 3–0 and third-place Vllaznia 5–2), they won the championship with a six-point lead. In the same year they would win also the Albanian Supercup.

The 1990s
After the fall of communism, Flamurtari had difficult moments. Many players left the club and went to play abroad. In the 1991–92 season the club started the championship with −6 points because of financial irregularities. Flamurtari finished the Kategoria e Pare in sixth place. In the next season the club faced a huge crisis finishing the season 13th out of 16 teams. But the team improved a lot and many new players from the Youth Academy were brought in. The 1993–94 season saw Flamurtari finishing 2nd and making Stadiumi Flamurtari a fortress, winning nine and drawing four out of 13 matches played home, but away from home the team had some horrible results culminating with a 5–0 away defeat to KF Laçi. The next two seasons Flamurtari would finish in fourth place. The 1996–97 would be the best season for Flamurtari after the fall of communism. The team had a great start in the season with eight wins in the first nine games. Finishing the 1st phase of the championship in the first place, Flamurtari started the second phase while Albania was suffering the 1997 riots. Flamurtari was leading until the week the championship was suspended and the Albanian Football Association decided to play all games after in Tirana, something Flamurtari could not afford because of the danger. So, after the games were played KF Tirana ended up winning the Championship, while Flamurtari finished in third place. The next seasons would be the worst for the team in the last 30 years with the team having its best placement in the 1998–99 season finishing 11th in a 16 team league.

Supporters
Flamurtari Vlorë fans are considered as the most passionate in Albania. They are, also, the vast majority of all Albania, with at least 20% of all Albanians. This is related with the fact that there has not been other football team in Vlorë. Usually, as mentioned in Petraq Hanxhari's book "" from Monday to Thursday the fans used to talk in every pub about the team's last game and condition of the players. On Thursday, after the team's usual test match with any local side, the fans would talk about the next game. But nowadays, the support for Flamurtari has been going down. Even though the ticket sales and the number of season-ticket holders has increased rapidly since 1999 (the lowest average attendance in the entire Flamurtari's history), there are much fewer in comparison with the Communist era. The two fan clubs supporting Flamurtari are "" and "". The latter usually stay in the East Stand, commonly known as "Tribuna C".

Club rivalries
Flamurtari Vlorë's main rival is KF Tirana. During the 1975s both clubs used to play the most beautiful football in Albania and the matches between them were the most attended from the supporters. The relations between the two clubs in and out of field were rude and supporters usually have had troubles and violence. Other rivals include the capital teams: Dinamo Tirana and Partizani Tirana. The rivalry with the capital teams comes from the 1980s famous matches between the clubs and the fact that Vlorë was the first capital of Albania and later capital became Tirana.. There is a lesser rivalry with Apolonia Fier and Teuta. The matches against Teuta are called the "coastal derbies". At years 2011–13, Flamurtari Vlorë had some troubles against Skënderbeu Korçë because of a clash between the fans of each team but the violence has subsided.

Stadium

Before the construction of the stadium, the club played their home games on a field known as Varri i Halimit, which translates to Halimi's Tomb. The field was located near Uji i Ftohtë, which is where the club's training ground is located. The stadium was built in 1961 with an initial capacity of 6,500, and was expanded to 11,000 in 1975 following reconstruction. During the club's golden era the stadium would attract crowds of up to 15,000 spectators and in 1987 when the club faced Barcelona in the UEFA Cup there was a crowd of 18,500, making it the ground's record attendance. Between 2004 and 2012 the ground was under recurring development with the aid of the Albanian Football Association which saw the ground converted into an all-seater stadium with a capacity of 8,500. In addition to the construction of the stands and the installation of seats, a new parking lot was built and floodlights were installed for the first time.

Crest and colours

Badges

The club's traditional colours are red and black, after the Albanian flag which was used by Ismail Qemali to declare Albania's independence in Vlorë on 28 November 1912. When the club was founded, it was agreed that the colours of the club would match those of the flag, as it had a played a significant role in the city's history. Flamurtari's first crest was designed in 1930 ahead of the club's first competitive match in the inaugural Albanian Football Championship, and it was designed to resemble the Vlorë Municipality coat of arms. Following the Second World War the club changed its crest to the shape of a shield, with the initial F in black in the middle of the shield on a red background. In the 1980s the club's crest changed once again but the shape and style still remained, but the club still placed the initial F on the football kits rather than the full crest until 2000. On 3 August 2015 the club announced that the crest would be changed ahead of the 2015–16 campaign as part of rebranding strategy, but they faced immediate pressure from fans as well as the local municipality who were unhappy at both the decision to change the crest and the new design. The shield shape was replaced by a circle with an F and half of a double headed eagle, as found on the Albanian flag.

Kits

A photograph of the first ever official championship game, taken on 6 April 1930, shows the players wearing a white jersey with a thick black horizontal stripe at the chest, black shorts and black socks. This design was common in England where post office worker and Flamurtari's president, Milto Korcari, ordered them from. Later, in 1937, the team adopted the vertical stripes and started playing in a red jersey with thin vertical black stripes, black shorts and black socks. In the first years of the team's history the kits featured even the team's emblem while later this was replaced with a golden "F" sewn in the middle of the chest.

After World War II, the team started using red kits, white shorts and red socks. In different championships the team used black shorts instead of white, similar to the design of the Albania national football team. The away kit was all white. This proved to be a popular design with the fans because it reminded them of the national team. In the 1960s however the primary kit was changed again and a new one was introduced. The new kit was white with three vertical stripes in the center (Red – Black – Red), black shorts and black socks. The red kit which earlier had been used as a home kit was now used as an away kit for the first team but it remained as a home kit for the youth team. In 1975 the club decided to reverse once again the kits and the red kit with white shorts and red socks became again the home kit. Away the team used its traditional white kit with the three central vertical stripes.

1981 marked the start of a new era at the club. Apart from a new promising generation of footballers blooming from the youth setup and great results on the pitch, a new kit was introduced which remains until today, with minor changes, the club's home kit. The kit was similar to the one used in the late 1930s, red with thin vertical black stripes, red shorts and red socks while the away kit was still the same. The kit proved to be popular with the fans, primarily because of the colours, which are the Albanian national colours, but also with the great achievements the team reached in this period.

Over the years the home kit has not had major changes and the design has remained almost the same, with the change being on the primar colour of the team, sometimes red and sometimes black, and in the colour of the shorts and socks which have changed from red to black. The away kit has been for many years the same with the club using an all-white in only five seasons since 1981.

A new third kit was introduced for the first time in 2005 to celebrate the team winning the Albanian First Division title. It was all red with red shirts, red shorts and red socks. The kit was used rarely and was dropped for the next season. In 2007 the numbers on the back were of golden colour for the first time in the club's history as the colour mainly used has been white. For the 2011–12 Albanian Superliga the team used an outfit based mostly on black. The kit featured a black chevron and red and black stripes below it, black shorts and black socks. The away kit remained the traditional away kit.

For the 2012–13 Albanian Superliga. Flamurtari will use a Legea design based primarily on red with black thick stripes, black shorts and black socks, while the club decided to drop the traditional away kit in favour of an all-white one.

Kit evolution

Shirt sponsors

Honours

Players

Current squad

Personnel

Historical list of coaches
This is the list of coaches of Flamurtari Vlorë since 1968:

   (-1968)
   (1968-)
   (1975–1978)
   (1979–1983)
   (1983–1988)
   (1990–1994)
   (1994–1996)
   (1996–1997)
   (1997)
   (1998)
   (1998–1999)
   (1999–2000)
   (2000–2001)
   (2001)
   (2001)
   (2002)
   (2002)
   (2003)
   (2003)
   (2003–2004)
   (2006)
   (2006)
   (2006–2007)
   (2007)
   (2007–2008)
   (2008)
   (2008–2009)
   (2009)
   (2009–2011)
   (2011)
   (2011–2012)
   (2012)
   (2012–2014)
   (2014–2015)
   (2015)
   (2015–2016)
   (2016)
   (2016)
   (2016–2017)
   (2017–2018)
   (2018)
   (2018–2019)
   (2019)
   (2019)
   (2019)
   (2019)
   (2020)
   (2020)
   (2020−Sep 2022)
   (Sep 2022-)

Recent seasons

Flamurtari Vlorë in Europe
In international level, they are best known for a series of good results obtained in the late 1980s, being one of the most successful Albanian team in the history of European Cups. In 1986–87 UEFA Cup season they played against Barcelona. The Spanish giants managed to knock them out only with the help of a late away goal as 1–1 in Vlorë and 0–0 in Barcelona. In the next season, Flamurtari managed to knock out Partizan as 2–0 in Vlorë and 1–2 in Belgrade and Wismut Aue as 0–1 in Aue and 2–0 in Vlorë before losing again to Barcelona as 1–4 in Barcelona and 1–0 in Vlorë. In the 2009–10 UEFA Europa League campaign they faced Motherwell from the Scottish Premier League. The team put in a strong performance despite playing against technically gifted opponents to record a 1–0 home victory. However, despite going to Scotland with confidence boosted, they were heavily and deservedly beaten 8–1.

References

External links
 
 Flamurtari Vlorë at Football-Lineups.com
 Flamurtari Vlorë at EUFO.DE
 Flamurtari Vlorë at UEFA

 
1923 establishments in Albania
Association football clubs established in 1923
Football clubs in Albania
Sport in Vlorë
Kategoria e Dytë clubs